Perfect High is a 2015 drama film produced by Lifetime and starring Bella Thorne, Israel Broussard, Daniela Bobadilla and Ross Butler. The film premiered June 27, 2015 on Lifetime.

Plot

A teenager named Amanda is obsessed with dance. She dislocates her knee during a school pep rally dance performance. She is rushed to a hospital where she is given the drug hydrocodone for pain. Upon returning to school, she is later approached by Riley, who asks her to share one of her pills with her. Amanda is suspicious, but gives her one anyway.

Later that week, Amanda starts dancing again, which makes Alexis a little jealous. While Amanda is waiting outside the school, Riley introduces Amanda to her boyfriend, Nate, and her brother, Carson. Amanda ends up hanging out with the group. Although Amanda is hesitant at first, they convince her to share her prescription meds with them.

Amanda ends up injuring her knee again and is given a renewed prescription of hydrocodone. Amanda is upset when she sees Carson and Bridget together at school again. She begins spending more time with Riley who persuades her to go for Carson. Amanda spends one day with Riley, Nate and Carson while watching movies and begins to grow a connection with Carson. While at an old lady's garage sale, they go into her house to use the bathroom and steal some oxycodone from her room and run out. While under the influence of the drugs, Carson and Amanda kiss and begin to spend more time together all the while Amanda's tolerance for the hydrocodone grows as she is shown taking the pills often. Unfortunately after her prescription runs out, she begins to feel sluggish and vomits due to withdrawal.

When Amanda catches Carson kissing his ex-girlfriend Bridget at a pharm party, she ignores his attempts to contact her until her birthday, where he approaches her while making an homage to her favorite movie, Say Anything..., and presents a slideshow of them together in an attempt to have her forgive him. Amanda is still very angry with him, but forgives him. Rick the dealer brings them drugs from Mexico to snort, claiming that it's cheap oxycontin. They snort the drugs and Amanda gets so high that she is slurring. She proceeds to black out, only regaining consciousness on her drive home when she almost crashes her car. She is later at Riley and Carson's house snorting the drug when they suddenly find out that they've actually been snorting heroin. Riley, just brushes it off, and Amanda makes Carson promise not to do it again. She again suffers from withdrawals.

After hearing her vomit during dinner, her mother suspects that she has an eating disorder and takes her to a doctor who prescribes her anti-anxiety medication. Amanda's team decides to replace her solo with Alexis on the audition, angering her. She finds out that Carson and the others have been doing heroin again and fools herself into believing that it can get her through her dance audition. They go to Rick to trade Amanda's anti-anxiety pills for heroin, and discover Riley shooting heroin. The others are worried at first, but later decide to try it too. While high, Carson and Amanda profess their love for another, and the group continues to drug themselves. Later, after hanging with Nate, Amanda, and Carson getting Starbucks, Riley begins to act frantic and urges the rest of the group to go on. While in the car, in the backseat, Riley begins to shoot heroin. Amanda then sees Riley turn blue and not wake up. Carson immediately rushes them to the hospital, where they are told Riley overdosed. Sadly, Riley is presumed to have died, due to the heroin intoxication. When Amanda gets back home, her mother confronts her about the heroin in her room that her brother found. Amanda goes to rehab, where she is visited by Alexis. She informs her about Carson and Nate. The two girls take a selfie together.

Cast
 Bella Thorne as Amanda
 Israel Broussard as Carson
 Daniela Bobadilla as Riley
 Ross Butler as Nate
 Matreya Fedor as Brooke
Jasmine Sky Sarin as Alexis
Cassidy Alexa as Bridget
Ryan Grantham as Robbie
Aren Buchholz as Rick
Lucia Walters as Coach Yost

Production

Pre-production
On February 2, 2015 it was announced Bella Thorne was the final person cast as the main character Amanda, who becomes a heroin addict, alongside Israel Broussard, Daniela Bobadilla and Ross Butler who would all portray Thorne's character's friends. Prior to casting, the film was tentatively titled Chasing the Tiger.

Filming
Production began on February 1, 2015 and ended on February 22, 2015 for a total of 17 days of shooting.  In an interview, Bella Thorne said that she knew Israel Broussard since she was 12, and that she was the one who told him to audition for the role of Carson.

Sequel

In 2021 Lifetime produced a sequel entitled Imperfect High starting Nia Sioux as Hanna Brooks. The film covers important topics such as anxiety disorder and the opioid crisis.

References

External links
 Official Lifetime site

Lifetime (TV network) films
American dance films
2015 television films
2015 films
Films directed by Vanessa Parise
2010s American films